A. Robinson Building, also known as Howard-Robinson Building and Pyramid Barber Shop, is a historic commercial building located at Winston-Salem, Forsyth County, North Carolina.  It was built in 1940–1941, and is a two-story, yellow and red brick commercial building. The north and south facades are of brick made by well-known and celebrated local brickmaker George S. Black.  The building was constructed to house African-American businesses including the Howard-Robinson Funeral Home and a barber shop.

It was listed on the National Register of Historic Places in 1998.

References

African-American history in Winston-Salem, North Carolina
Commercial buildings on the National Register of Historic Places in North Carolina
Commercial buildings completed in 1940
Buildings and structures in Winston-Salem, North Carolina
National Register of Historic Places in Winston-Salem, North Carolina